John Junior, known as The Duckman is a British mental health activist and script consultant. He is known for co-creating, inspiring and featuring in multi-award winning and BAFTA  nominated documentary series Hollyoaks IRL. In November 2019 he created the mental health movement "John and Charlie's Journey," to raise awareness for suicide and mental illness.

Background 
Junior was born with short leg syndrome, has a clubfoot and suffers with arthritis. He was homeless at the age of 16. Junior lost his dad in 2018.

Activism 
In 2019, Junior started vlogging about his experiences of mental health issues on Instagram in order to reach others with mental health difficulties. In May 2020 Junior tested Samaritans self-help app for UNILAD during mental health awareness week. Junior subsequently talked to UNILAD about their mental health struggles to help raise awareness for world suicide prevention day on 10 September 2020.

In November 2019, Junior created a mental health movement called "John and Charlie's Journey". Junior travels around the United Kingdom with Charlie The Duck, (a stuffed toy teddy), to encourage people to talk about mental health and to end the judgement & stigma surrounding mental health.

In September 2020 the "DBT for all campaign" was created by Junior to make dialectical behaviour therapy available and this therapy is used to treat children, teenagers and adults who are suicidal, self-harm, and have self-destructive behaviours. The purpose of the campaign is to make DBT therapy more widely available on the NHS throughout the United Kingdom. Supporting the campaign is Esther McVey, Conservative MP for Tatton, who has applied for parliamentary debate at Westminster Hall.
In October 2020, Junior started a campaign for the British government to fund billboards to sign post people to safety who are struggling with mental health throughout the coronavirus pandemic.

Junior works with Samaritans, MIND, and Papyrus mental health charities to raise awareness, reduce stigma and prevent suicides.

Hollyoaks 
At the start of the first UK lockdown in March 2020, Junior was struggling with suicidal thoughts. After watching a Hollyoaks storyline that involved suicide, BBC Radio 5 filmed Junior thanking the storyline and the show.

Channel 4 have commissioned Limepictures to produce Hollyoaks IRL a series of short films of real-life stories. Junior's episode "Hollyoaks saved my life" was the first episode to be released on 16 June 2021. Junior went viral for his participation in the series Hollyoaks IRL. Hollyoaks saved my life (Hollyoaks IRL), has been nominated for the a BAFTA TV Award, in the Short Form Programme 2022.

Hollyoaks IRL series was inspired by Junior, and he was invited by Channel 4 to attended the British Academy Television Awards, on 8 May 2022 at the Royal Festival Hall in London. He was accompanied by Charlie the Duck, Vera Chok who plays Honour Chen-Williams and Kieron Richardson who plays Ste Hay in the British Soap Opera Hollyoaks.
Junior is making a feature film with Chloe Richardson called 'The Mood is Temporary', inspired by the Hollyoaks storyline that saved junior's life. 

On 26th November 2022, Junior and Charlie The Duck attended the Royal Television Society Awards (North West) and received Best Digital Creativity award for Hollyoaks IRL series, which was presented by hosts Adam Thomas and Jenny Powell.

Filmography

Awards and nominations

References

External links 

 
 John Junior on Twitter 

Year of birth missing (living people)
Living people
Mental health activists
English media personalities
People from Wilmslow
British rappers